Liga Leumit (lit. National League) is the second tier level league of basketball competition in Israel. It is the league level that is below the first tier Israeli Premier League.

League system

The league contains 15 clubs that compete in a home-and-away round-robin. At the end of the season, the top eight clubs advance to the play-offs. The first round is played on a best-of-three basis. The four winning clubs advance to two best-of-five playoffs, the winners of which are promoted to the Super League.

The two teams that finish at the bottom of the table are relegated to Liga Artzit.

Current teams

Promotion and relegation

See also
Israel Basketball Association
Basketball in Israel

References

External links
 Facebook page (in Hebrew)
 Twitter account (in Hebrew)

 
2
Israel
Professional sports leagues in Israel